The 3rd Guards Baranovichi Red Banner Fighter Aviation Regiment is a fighter regiment of the Russian Air Force.

The regiment was formed on 21 October 1941 from personnel of the Chelyabinsk School of Gunners and Bombardiers as the 688th Night Light Bomber Aviation Regiment. Less than a month later, just after completing training, the regiment left for the front. It fought in the Rzhev salient until January 1942, and in the summer of 1942 in the Battle of Stalingrad. For its actions at Stalingrad, the regiment became the 59th Guards Assault Aviation Regiment on 8 February 1943. On 2 September 1943 received the Order of the Red Banner. It fought in Orel-Kursk operation, Operation Bagration, and Warsaw offensive [likely Warsaw-Poznan Offensive in Jan 1945, but could also be the Lublin-Brest Offensive in summer 1944]. For actions in liberating Baranovichi, it received the Baranovichi honorific 27 June 1944.  It was later awarded Order of Suvorov 3rd class for actions in the Berlin Offensive on 16 April 1945. 

From 1949 to 1956 the regiment was the 725th Guards Assault Aviation Regiment, flying from Altes-Lager, Dallgow, Dessau, Brandis, and Finsterwalde in Germany.

In August 1956, the regiment relocated to Astrakhan, became part of PVO, and renamed 393rd Guards Fighter Aviation Regiment. In December 1992 it became the 209th Guards Fighter Aviation Regiment, part of 12th Air Defence Corps, Russian Air Defence Forces. 12th Air Defence Corps became 51st Air Defence Corps in 1998, and soon afterwards became part of the 4th Air and Air Defence Forces Army.

On 1 September 2001 the regiment absorbed the 562nd Fighter Aviation Regiment at Krymsk and became the 3rd Guards Fighter Aviation Regiment (3rd GvIAP) with transfer of battle flag and honorifics of 209th GvIAP and moved to Krymsk. On 24 August 2009, the 3rd GvIAP and 178th Separate Helicopter-Rescue Detachment became 6972nd Guards Baranovichi Red Banner Order of Suvorov 3rd Class Air Base of the 1st Category at Krymsk. On 11 November 2013, the 3rd Guards Fighter Aviation Regiment was assigned to the 1st Guards Composite Aviation Division of the Southern Military District with transfer of the 6972nd's honorifics and flag. Colonel Tagir Gadzhiyev was the division commander in 2016.

By June 2019, the regiment became the first aviation unit to begin receiving serial Sukhoi Su-57 fifth-generation fighters.  The commander of the regiment, Colonel Anatoly Stasyukevich, was killed in the 2022 Russian invasion of Ukraine when his motorcade was hit in a Ukrainian artillery strike.

References

Further reading
Archived Russian forum post where somebody tried to compile a history of the 6972nd Air Base Unfortunately most of the links referenced are permanently dead. 
Ural State Military History Museum had a brief paragraph about regt in WWII b/c Chelyabinsk in Urals.
  According to this 2017 press release from his home area, Tagir Gadzhiyev is now a Major General. 

Regiments of the Russian Air Forces
Military units and formations established in 1992
Military units and formations disestablished in 2001